Robert Ellsworth Patrick Aloysius Brady (December 31, 1914 – February 27, 1972) was an American actor and musician best known as the "comical sidekick" of the popular cowboy film and television star Roy Rogers on his eponymous radio and television series.

Biography

Born in Toledo, Ohio, shortened to Bob Brady. Pat Brady first appeared on stage at the age of four, in a road-show production of Mrs. Wiggs of the Cabbage Patch. From that initial stage appearance until his death, his life was dedicated to the world of entertainment as a musician and actor, almost exclusively in comedic roles. In 1935, while working as a bassist in California, Pat struck up a friendship with a young country-and-western singer named Leonard Slye, a member of the popular Sons of the Pioneers. When Len Slye was elevated to screen stardom as Roy Rogers, he recommended Brady as his replacement in "The Sons". However, as Bob Nolan, an original member of The Sons, was referred to as "Bob," and The Sons thought one "Bob" was enough, "Bob Brady" then became "Pat Brady".

Making the transition to films himself in 1937, Brady played comedy relief in several of the Charles Starrett Westerns at Columbia Pictures. 

Brady served in the U.S. Army and was at the Battle of the Bulge with Patton's Third Army. He was awarded citations and two Purple Hearts.

In the early 1940s, he moved to Republic, where he played zany camp cook Sparrow Biffle in the Roy Rogers vehicles. When Rogers moved to television in 1951, he took Brady with him. Now billed as "himself," Brady enlivened over 100 episodes of The Roy Rogers Show, usually driving about the sagebrush at the wheel of his faithful jeep "Nellybelle."

Long after the cancellation of the weekly series, Brady continued his association with Rogers on television and in personal appearances. He also rejoined the Sons of the Pioneers in 1959 as a replacement for Shug Fisher, a well-known character actor. In late 1962, Brady appeared with Rogers and Evans in their short-lived ABC comedy, western, and variety program The Roy Rogers and Dale Evans Show, which lost out in the Saturday evenings ratings to The Jackie Gleason Show on CBS. Joining Brady on that program was comedian Cliff Arquette in his Charley Weaver role. Coincidentally, Arquette, like Brady, was born in Toledo.

Pat Brady died at the age of fifty-seven in Green Mountain Falls, Colorado. At his funeral on March 1, 1972, Hugh Farr and Lloyd Perryman, both members of the Sons of the Pioneers, sang "Tumbling Tumbleweeds" and "At the Rainbows End".

Selected filmography
 Rio Grande (1938)
 West of Cheyenne (1938)
 The Durango Kid (1940)
 Texas Stagecoach (1940)
 Man from Cheyenne (1942)
 Melody Time (1948) as himself
 The Golden Stallion (1949)
 Heldorado (1946) (uncredited)
 Loving You (1957) Band Member

References

Further reading
 Rothel, David. 1984. Those Great Cowboy Sidekicks.  Scarecrow Press, Metuchen, New Jersey.

External links
 

1914 births
1972 deaths
Male actors from Toledo, Ohio
American male television actors
20th-century American male actors
American male film actors
People from Green Mountain Falls, Colorado
United States Army personnel of World War II
Sons of the Pioneers members